Bakhmach is a city located in Nizhyn Raion of Chernihiv Oblast (province), in northern Ukraine. It hosts the administration of Bakhmach urban hromada, one of the hromadas of Ukraine. It has a population of

History

Bakhmach was first mentioned in 1147 in the Hypatian Codex. Rapid development began in the 1860s and 1870s when the Libau–Romny Railway line nearby was under construction. The Battle of Bakhmach was fought between the Czech legion in Russia, and German forces occupying Ukraine. Following a Legion victory, the Germans negotiated a truce. In January 1919, the city was the site of battles between the invading Bolsheviks forces and the Chornomorska Division, which was attempting to keep the Left-bank Ukraine under the control of the army of the Ukrainian National Republic (UNR). During World War II, Bakhmach was under German occupation from 13 September 1941 and was liberated 9 September 1943 by the 75th Guards Rifle Division.

Name origins

An ethnographer explains the name of the city:

However, the most authoritative historian of the city Bahmach, Vladimir Stepanovich Yevfymovskyy, indicates that the settlement is based on the Bahmach River, and thus originated in an agricultural tradition.

Ancient Times (10th century)
The old city defense is one of the oldest settlements in the East. First mentioned in 1147 in "The Tale of Bygone Years" from the Hypatian Codex, and belonged to the Chernigov principality, but soon was destroyed along with the cities Vyvolozh, White Tower, Unizh (now the village Syvolozh, Białowieża and the city of Nizhyn) during the feudal strife between the princes Olegovichy Chernihiv and Mstislavovich Kyiv.

Polish and Cossack era (17th century)
In the first half of the 17th century on the site of the ancient city of Bahmach was reborn with the same name (in this period, many cities were rebuilt such as Nezhin, Konotop, Baturin, Borzna, Ichnia).

In 1648, during the war under the direction of B. Khmelnitsky, residents of Bahmach were formed as part of a Chernigov Sotnia Regiment; thus, making the town a "Sotnia town."

Some of the famous Sotnia Captains from Bahkmach:

Bilotserkivets Panko Omelyanovych (? -1649-?)
Pavlo S. Tishchenko (? -1654.01.-?)
Hrodetskyy John S. (? -1661-?)
Pavlo S. Tishchenko (? -1662.10.-1666-?)
Hrodetskyy John S. (? -1669.02.-?)
Paschenko Jacob (? -1672-?)
Bilotserkivets Michael Omelyanovych (? -1676-?)
Biliak Theodore L. (? -1682.07.-?)
(Dan the Terrible, before 1689),
R. Stephen (1695-1700)
Sawicki Samiylo (1700-?)

Companions of Hetman Mazepa (17th-18th centuries)
Bahkmach and neighboring Holinska Sotnia were a sort of guard for Hetman Ivan Mazepa, who were particularly committed to their captains, and supported his union with Sweden; which was against Moscow's destroyers and usurpers, Baturyn.

At the end of the 17th century, near Bahmach, Mazepa "sponsored" the construction of the palace park plantation VI. This country residence was for Hetman, which was inconvenient to show to others." This brought Philip Orlik Jesuit Zelensky with the versatile Polish king. In October 1708, Mazepa was sent from the palace to Charles Bystrytsky XII with a statement: "Come to Bakhmach yourself and publicly swear on the Gospel... that is not for the own private profit, but for the common good of the whole of the motherland and the troops will give the patronage to the King of Sweden."

Since 1781, Bahmach was a township of Konotop raion within the Chernihiv Oblast. Bahkmach gained official status 1938.

Under the Russian Empire (19th century)

Bahmach was known as a "chumak" city which traded Crimean salt and Cherkassy fish on the market.

In 1866, the town and the Konotopsky raion within the Chernigov oblast, the population was 5270 (2399 male; 2550 female). There were: 601 farm yards, two Orthodox churches, a rural court, bazaars, and fairs.

Bahmach's rapid development began after the completion of the 1869 Kursk-Kyiv and Libau-Romny (1873) railways. Then, the station was built and the village railway, which marked the beginning of the modern city.

In 1885, the population was 4741. There were: 888 farm yards, three Orthodox churches, 2 schools, one post office, an inn, 10 stood houses, a shop, a windmill, some markets and annual fairs.

In the 1897 census, the number of inhabitants rose to 6844 people (3355 male; 3489 female), 6623 of which were Orthodox.

The 1897 census the population was 839 (449 male; 390 female), 617 of which were Orthodox, 170 of which were Jewish.

In the 1897 census, the population was 1,047 (532 male; 515 female), 624 of which were Orthodox, 321 of which were Jewish.

In 1892, the Zemstvo school for children of railway workers was opened. In Bahkmach, a steam mill began operation in 1894, and a distillery in 1894.

In 1903 and 1905, a strike among railroad workers occurred.

Railway settlements that existed in isolation 

 Kyiv-Voronezh
 Libau-Romny

After 1917
November 10, 1917

There was an attempt to declare Bahmach a Communist government, but it failed. The military command of the Central Council resumed quickly and Ukrainian authorities took control of the important railway point. Headquarters units of the Bakhmatsk Blue division of the UNR were located in Seven local schools.

January 15, 1918 

Troops from Moscow and the Petrograd Bolsheviks with the Red Cossacks regiment stormed Bakhmach and captured the City Council and the railway junction.

Until 18 July 2020, Bakhmach served as an administrative center of Bakhmach Raion. The raion was abolished in July 2020 as part of the administrative reform of Ukraine, which reduced the number of raions of Chernihiv Oblast to five. The area of Bakhmach Raion was merged into Nizhyn Raion.

Demographics

Population

Distribution of Native Language (2001)

Transport
The city has three railway stations: 

 Bakhmach-Pasazhyrsky
 Bakhmach-Kyivskyi
 Bakhmach-Homelskyi.

Culture

Media 
Bahkmach regional independent newspaper "Advisor" «Порадник»
The district newspaper "Voice Pryseymiv'ya" «Голос Присеймів'я»

Infrastructure

The city has three railway stations:

 Bakhmach-Pasazhyrsky
 Bakhmach-Kyivskyi
 Bakhmach-Homelskyi

References

External links
 City Site
 City's Newspaper "Poradnik"
 The murder of the Jews of Bakhmach during World War II, at Yad Vashem website.
 В. М. Чуйко.  Бахмач  // Енциклопедія сучасної України :  [укр.]> : у 30 т. / НАН України, Наукове товариство ім. Шевченка, Інститут енциклопедичних досліджень НАН України. — , 2001—.... — .
 Офіційний сайт Бахмача
 Бахмацька районна незалежна газета «Порадник».
 Історія міста Бахмач
 В. П. Коваленко. Бохмач // Енциклопедія історії України : у 10 т. / редкол.: В. А. Смолій (голова) та ін. ; Інститут історії України НАН України. — : «Наукова думка», 2003. — Т. 1 : А — В. — С. 359. — .
 БАХМАЧ. Офіційний веб-сайт управління культури і туризму Чернігівської облдержадміністрації
 Бахмацький район. Історична довідка
 Цитати зі свідчень очевидців Голодомору 1932–1933 років в Україні
 Бахмацька сотня. 1648–1782 pp.
 Володимир Євфимовський — історик Бахмача
 Бахмацький район. Де можна зупинитись? Заклади розміщення
 Бахмацький район. Зелений (сільський) туризм
 Бахмацький район. Що робити? Туристичні послуги
 Бахмацький район. Екскурсійні маршрути по пам'ятках Батуринського державного історико — культурного заповідника «Гетьманська столиця»
 ВРУ
 АМУ
 История Станции Бахмач
 Бахмацький район. Загальна характеристика
 Сайт міста Бахмач. Інформаційний портал
 Фотополювання. Бахмач
 Історія Бахмача
 Банк даних Державної служби статистики України 
 Cities & towns of Ukraine

Cities in Chernihiv Oblast
Konotopsky Uyezd
Cities of district significance in Ukraine
Holocaust locations in Ukraine